Ronald Todd (born 4 October 1935) is a Scottish former professional footballer who played as a wing half in the English Football League for Accrington Stanley.

References

1935 births
Living people
Footballers from Bellshill
Scottish footballers
Association football wing halves
Lesmahagow F.C. players
Accrington Stanley F.C. (1891) players
Chelmsford City F.C. players
English Football League players